The Incheon Metropolitan Council is the local council of Incheon.

There are a total of 40 members, with 36 members elected in the First-past-the-post voting system and 4 members elected in Party-list proportional representation.

Current composition 

The Incheon Metropolitan Council has no regulations on the negotiation group.

Organization 
The structure of Council consists of:
Chairman
Two Vice-chairmen
Standing Committees
Council Operation Committee
Planning and Administration Committee
Culture and Welfare Committee
Industrial Committee
Construction and Transportation Committee
Educational Committee
Special Committees
Special Committee for Budget & Accounts
Special Committee on Ethics

Recent election results

2018 

|- style="text-align:center;"
! rowspan="2" colspan="3" width="200" | Party
! colspan="4" | Constituency
! colspan="4" | Party list
! colspan="2" | Total seats
|- style="text-align:center;"
! width="70" | Votes
! width="40" | %
! width="40" | Seats
! width="32" | ±
! width="70" | Votes
! width="40" | %
! width="40" | Seats
! width="32" | ±
! width="40" | Seats
! width="32" | ±
|-
| width="1" style="background-color:" |
| style="text-align:left;" colspan=2| Democratic Party of Korea
| 847,939 || 64.64 || 32 || 22
| 733,691 || 55.27 || 2 || 0
| 34 || 22
|-
| width="1" style="background-color:" |
| style="text-align:left;" colspan=2| Liberty Korea Party
| 413,517 || 31.52 || 1 || 20
| 350,909 || 26.43 || 1 || 1
| 2 || 21
|-
| width="1" style="background-color:" |
| style="text-align:left;" colspan=2| Justice Party
| 15,330 || 1.17 || 0 || 0
| 122,539 || 9.23 || 1 || 1
| 1 || 1
|-
| width="1" style="background-color:" |
| style="text-align:left;" colspan=2| Bareunmirae Party
| 27,993 || 2.14 || 0 || new
| 88,093 || 6.63 || 0 || new
| 0 || new
|-
| width="1" style="background-color:" |
| style="text-align:left;" colspan=2| Party for Democracy and Peace
| colspan=4 
| 8,909 || 0.67 || 0 || new
| 0 || new
|-
| width="1" style="background-color:" |
| style="text-align:left;" colspan=2| Green Party Korea
| colspan=4 
| 7,900 || 0.59 || 0 || 0
| 0 || 0
|-
| width="1" style="background-color:" |
| style="text-align:left;" colspan=2| Minjung Party
| colspan=4 
| 5,645 || 0.42 || 0 || new
| 0 || new
|-
| width="1" style="background-color:#DC143C" |
| style="text-align:left;" colspan=2| Labor Party
| 2,534 || 0.19 || 0 || 0
| 4,979 || 0.37 || 0 || 0
| 0 || 0
|-
| width="1" style="background-color:" |
| style="text-align:left;" colspan=2| Korean Patriots' Party
| colspan=4 
| 4,566 || 0.34 || 0 || new
| 0 || new
|-
| width="1" style="background-color:" |
| style="text-align:left;" colspan=2| Independents
| 4,507 || 0.34 || 0 || 0
| colspan=4 
| 0 || 0
|-
|- style="background-color:#E9E9E9"
| colspan=3 style="text-align:center;" | Total
| 1,311,820 || 100.00 || 33 || –
| 1,327,231 || 100.00 || 4 || –
| 37 || –
|}

References 

Incheon
City councils
Local government in South Korea
Provincial councils of South Korea